Ouder-Amstel is a municipality in the Netherlands, in the province of North Holland.

Population centres 
The municipality of Ouder-Amstel consists of the following cities, towns, villages and/or districts: Duivendrecht, Ouderkerk aan de Amstel, Waver.

Topography

Dutch Topographic map of the municipality of Ouder-Amstel, June 2015

Local government 
The municipal council of Ouder-Amstel consists of 15 seats, which are divided as follows:

Radio station 
The local radio station for Duivendrecht is Jamm fm 104.9 Smooth & Funky.

Notable people 
 Gijsbrecht IV of Amstel (ca.1235–ca.1303) a powerful lord and member of the Van Aemstel family. 
 Wim Eijk (born 1953 in Duivendrecht) a Dutch prelate of the Catholic Church, a cardinal and Archbishop of Utrecht
 Femke Wolting (born 1970 in Ouder-Amstel) a Dutch independent new media producer
 Meindert Klem (born 1987 in Ouderkerk aan de Amstel) a rower, competed in the 2008 and 2012 Summer Olympics

Gallery

References

External links 

 
Municipalities of North Holland